Cardrona is the name of a locality in the Cardrona Valley in New Zealand, with the nearby skifield of Cardrona Alpine Resort and Mount Cardrona also using the same name. Established as a gold rush township in the 1860s on the banks of the small river of the same name, it is known for its distinctive hotel of gold rush vintage which is on the opposite side of the river to the original township of which few buildings remain. It is in a scenic setting on the Crown Range road which connects Wanaka and Queenstown.

Recent developments include expanded facilities for guest accommodation at Benbrae Resort, recreational facilities, a distillery,. and a 400-house suburb. Cardrona is the home of the internationally known Race to the Sky hillclimb which was last held in 2015.

History
The name was given to the area by J. T. Thomson after the Scottish village of Cardrona.

A long history, including the now almost-forgotten contribution of the labour from thousands of Chinese workers, is revealed by historical features such as the Cardrona Hotel and the much-loved Cardrona Hall and Church, the location of the annual Cardrona Folk Music Festival. The much photographed local Cardrona pub was made famous by the advertising campaign of Speight's brewery of Dunedin. Speight's has since capitalised on the popularity of the Cardrona pub by building replicas of the distinctive Cardrona period building in other parts of New Zealand, including Mt Eden in Auckland.

Demographics

Cardrona had a population of 633 at the 2018 New Zealand census, an increase of 126 people (24.9%) since the 2013 census, and an increase of 204 people (47.6%) since the 2006 census. There were 309 households. There were 333 males and 303 females, giving a sex ratio of 1.1 males per female. The median age was 45.9 years (compared with 37.4 years nationally), with 99 people (15.6%) aged under 15 years, 93 (14.7%) aged 15 to 29, 321 (50.7%) aged 30 to 64, and 120 (19.0%) aged 65 or older.

Ethnicities were 96.7% European/Pākehā, 4.7% Māori, 0.9% Pacific peoples, 1.4% Asian, and 1.9% other ethnicities (totals add to more than 100% since people could identify with multiple ethnicities).

The proportion of people born overseas was 21.8%, compared with 27.1% nationally.

Although some people objected to giving their religion, 58.3% had no religion, 33.2% were Christian, 0.5% were Hindu, 0.5% were Muslim and 1.4% had other religions.

Of those at least 15 years old, 165 (30.9%) people had a bachelor or higher degree, and 48 (9.0%) people had no formal qualifications. The median income was $42,200, compared with $31,800 nationally. 120 people (22.5%) earned over $70,000 compared to 17.2% nationally. The employment status of those at least 15 was that 309 (57.9%) people were employed full-time, 102 (19.1%) were part-time, and 6 (1.1%) were unemployed.

References

External links

1860s establishments in New Zealand
Otago Gold Rush
Populated places in Otago